Ushuaia Aeroclub is a public use airport serving Ushuaia, a city in the Tierra del Fuego Province of Argentina.

The airport is along the western shore of Ushuaia Bay, a harbor on the northern coast of the Beagle Channel. The runway has  paved overruns on each end. Approach and departures will be partially over the water. The Ushuaia International Airport is only  directly south of the Aeroclub runway.

See also

Transport in Argentina
List of airports in Argentina

References

External links 
 OpenStreetMap - Ushuaia Aeroclub
OurAirports - Ushuaia Aeroclub
FallingRain - Ushuaia Est Aeronaval

Airports in Argentina
Ushuaia